Urazbakhty (Uraźbaxtı) is a rural locality (a selo) in Alkinsky Selsoviet, Chishminsky District, Bashkortostan, Russia. The population was 457 as of 2010. There are 13 streets.

Geography 
Urazbakhty is located 20 km northeast of Chishmy (the district's administrative centre) by road. Salikhovo is the nearest rural locality.

References 

Rural localities in Chishminsky District